Andrés Sedano (born 14 August 1973) is a Guatemalan former swimmer who competed in the 1992 Summer Olympics.

References

1973 births
Living people
Guatemalan male freestyle swimmers
Olympic swimmers of Guatemala
Swimmers at the 1992 Summer Olympics
Place of birth missing (living people)